Rokujizō Station (六地蔵駅 Rokujizō-eki) refers to three different railway stations of the same name, located within the same vicinity in Rokujizo Naramachi, Uji, Kyoto, each operated by a different train company. Only the station of the Keihan Uji Line is located in Momoyamacho Inaba, Fushimi-ku, Kyoto. The station name means "Six Jizō". Keihan Electric railway station number is KH73, JR West Station number is JR-D06, and the Kyoto Municipal subway station number is T01.

Lines
Each of the following three lines has its own Rokujizō Station facilities.
 Keihan Uji Line
  Nara Line
 
 

Firstly, there is the relatively recent addition of a station at the terminus of the Subway Tozai Line that runs from Uzumasa Tenjingawa Station in Kyoto down to the southeastern part of the city. Secondly, in proximity to the municipal subway station is the station operated by West Japan Railway Company, on the Nara Line. Rapid trains from Kyoto now also stop here (in addition to the local trains) and the trip normally takes no longer than 12 minutes. Finally, approximately 150 meters from both the subway and JR stations is the Rokujizo station operated by the Keihan Electric Railway.

Overview
The Keihan Station on the west side across the Yamashina River is located in Fushimi-ku, Kyoto City, while the JR and subway stations on the east Side are located in Uji City, thus the stations are divided into two cities.

When the station was opened in 1913, the station was named "Rokujizo-san" because Daizenji, which is also one of the Kyoto Rokujizo (Rokujizo) in the west-northwest of the Sta., has been popular since ancient times. It was a single station of Keihan Long, in 1992, the JR station was established in the Uji City side, and the subway station was opened in 2004, and the Keihan Uji line, the Nara Line of JR West, and the railway station on the Tozai line of the subway have the same name. Rokujizō Station is the only Kyoto Municipal Subway station located outside Kyoto.

JR and subway stations are almost the same position as the ground and underground, but the Keihan station is about 400m southwest, and the two stations are contacted via a public road along the Yamashina River. The JR West station uses ICOCA, and the Keihan and subway stations are included in the use area of PiTaPa and "Slussen and Kansai". In addition, the subway station also supports the Traffica Kyoto card.

Layout

Keihan Railway

The ground-level station operated by Keihan Railway has an island platform situated between two tracks which can accommodate five-car trains. The station is located in the middle of a curved alignment. There is one entrance with ticket gates on the first floor, with the platform located on the second floor, and a waiting room with air-conditioning installed in the station.

In addition to the stairs, there is a wheelchair-accessible elevator between the ticket gates and the platform, and there are barrier-free facilities such as a multi-purpose toilet installed in the restroom of the first floor.

There is a bus terminal in front of the station. From 1998 to the following year, it was also a stop station of the Uji Rapid train which had been operating as a seasonal train onto the direct Keihan Main Line.

JR West

The JR West station is elevated with an island platform located between two tracks. The station's ticket gates are located in only one area. There platform gap is noticeably wide because the station is located on a curved section of track. A comb-like rubber layer is installed along the edge of the platform. The rubber has the strength that can support the weight of the passenger, and it is said that there is no safety problem even when the rubber and the vehicle are in contact.

In addition, by moving the station platform to the Kyoto direction of the curve in accordance with the double-tracking project for the Nara Line, measures will be taken to widen the platform and reduce the gap between the train and the platform.

Kyoto Subway Tozai Line

The underground station has an island platform serving two tracks with platform screen doors installed.

Only one entrance with ticket gate exists. Each station of the Tozai Line has a colour scheme, with the station color for Rokujizō being Wasurenagusa-iro(forget-me-not).

The station number of Rokujizō Station is T01.

History
The oldest railway in this area is the Nara Line which has been operating since 1896, but the history of Rokujizō Station began with the opening of the Keihan line in 1913 because the Nara Line did not have its station in Rokujizō until 1992.

The Keihan station opened on 1 June 1913. The present-day JR West station opened on 22 October 1992, and the subway station opened on 26 November 2004.

Station numbering was introduced to the JR West platforms in March 2018 with Rokujizō being assigned station number JR-D06.

Usage information
The transition of the number of users is as follows.

What is written here is the number of people who took the train.

Surrounding area
The surrounding area has a number of hotels, extensive shops, restaurants and amusement centers. It has undergone significant development in recent years as more people choose to live there or nearby and make use of the excellent transport links to Kyoto and Osaka.

Daizen-ji
MOMO Kintetsu (Kintetsu Department Store)
Kyoto Animation Studio 1
Ito Yokado Rokujizo
Izumiya Rokujizo

Adjacent stations

References

External links
 Rokujizo Station  Keihan Electric Railway (Japanese)
 Rokujizou Station  West Japan Railway Company (Japanese)

Railway stations in Japan opened in 1913
Railway stations in Japan opened in 1992
Railway stations in Japan opened in 2004
Railway stations in Kyoto Prefecture
Stations of West Japan Railway Company